Hồ Chí Minh (1890–1969) was a Vietnamese communist leader.

Hồ Chí Minh may also refer to:
 Hồ Chí Minh City, the largest city in Vietnam
 Hồ Chí Minh trail, logistical system used during the Vietnam War.
 Ho Chi Minh Young Pioneer Organization a communist youth organization
 Ho Chi Minh Communist Youth Union
 Ho Chi Minh Thought
 Hồ Chí Minh Prize
 Ho Chi Minh Highway